German hospital may refer to:
 The German Hospital, Dalston, a former hospital in London, near Fassett Square
 German Hospital in Tirana, a hospital in Tirana, Albania
 Taksim German Hospital, a hospital in Istanbul, Turkey
 Yemen German Hospital, a hospital in Sana'a, Yemen
 Lenox Hill Hospital in Manhattan, New York City, whose original name was "German Hospital" and then "German Hospital and Dispensary"

See also
 List of hospitals in Germany